Khatun (Mongolian:  хатан; ;  or قادین  kadın;  khātūn;) is a female title of nobility and counterpart to "khan" or "Khagan" prominently used in the Turkic Khaganates and in the subsequent Mongol Empire.

Etymology and history
Before the advent of Islam in Central Asia, Khatun was the title of the queen of Bukhara. According to the Encyclopaedia of Islam, "Khatun [is] a title of Sogdian origin borne by the wives and female relatives of the Göktürks and subsequent Turkish rulers."

According to Bruno De Nicola in Women in Mongol Iran: The Khatuns, 1206-1335, the linguistic origins of the term “khatun” are unknown,  though possibly of Old Turkic or Sogdian origin. De Nicola states that prior to the spread of the Mongols across Central Asia, Khatun meant ‘lady’ or ‘noblewoman’ and is found in broad usage in medieval Persian and Arabic texts.

Peter Benjamin Golden observed that the title qatun appeared among the Göktürks as the title for the khagan's wife and was borrowed from Sogdian xwāten "wife of the ruler" Earlier, British Orientalist Gerard Clauson (1891–1974) defined xa:tun as "'lady' and the like" and says there is "no reasonable doubt that it is taken from Sogdian xwt'yn (xwatēn), in Sogdian xwt'y ('lord, ruler') and xwt'yn 'lord's or ruler's wife'), "which is precisely the meaning of xa:tun in the early period."

Modern usage
In Uzbek, the language spoken in modern-day Bukhara, in Uzbekistan, the word is spelled xotin and has come to simply refer to any woman. In Turkish, it is written hatun. The general Turkish word for 'woman', kadın, is a doublet derived from the same origin.

Notable Khatuns
 Börte, wife of Genghis Khan
 Buluqhan Khatun, wife of Abaqa Khan
 Gurju Khatun, wife of Kaykhusraw II
 Bulugan, wife of Temur Khan
 Chabi, wife of Kublai Khan
 Despina Khatun
 Doquz Khatun, wife of Hulagu Khan
 Erketü Qatun, wife of Altan Khan
 Mandukhai Khatun, wife of Dayan Khan
 Momine Khatun
 Oghul Qaimish, wife of Guyuk Khan
 Po Beg
 Radnashiri, wife of Ayurbarwada Buyantu Khan
 Syeda Momena Khatun, daughter of Ghiyasuddin Mahmud Shah
 Töregene Khatun (d. 1246), wife of Ogedei Khan, regent of the Mongol Empire from 1241 to 1246
 Anu Khatun, wife of Sengge and Galdan Boshugtu Khan

See also
 Hatun
 Khan
 Begum
 Baig
 Begzada
 List of Mongol khatuns

References

Citations

Sources 
 Works cited

Further reading
 

Court titles
Royal titles
Noble titles
Titles in Bangladesh
Titles in Afghanistan
Titles in Pakistan
Ottoman titles
Sogdian words and phrases
History of the Turkic peoples
Mongolian nobility
Turkish words and phrases
Bengali words and phrases
Bengali Muslim surnames
Women's social titles
Women of the Mongol Empire